François de Coligny (1557–1591) comte de Coligny and seigneur de Châtillon-sur-Loing was a French Protestant general of the Wars of Religion.  He was the son of Gaspard II de Coligny (1519–1572), Admiral of France (Amiral de Coligny).

Military career
He first saw action at the defence of Montpellier during the Sixth War of Religion (1576–1577).  First he razed the citadel, guarded by royal soldiers.  Then, when the situation became difficult, he made a sortie across the Cévennes to Bergerac to recruit reinforcements and fought his way back into the town.

At the start of the war of the Catholic League, when king Henry III had practically no other support, he beat the Duke of Mayenne near Chartres in 1589.

He distinguished himself at the battle of Arques (September 1589), where his arrival at the head of 500 arquebusiers allowed the victory of Henry IV to be expanded upon.

Marriage and issue
On 18 May 1581, he married Marguerite d'Ailly (?–1604), daughter of Charles d'Ailly seigneur de Seigneville. They had 4 children:
 Henri (?-10 September 1601) comte de Coligny (etc.) and seigneur de Châtillon, died in 1601 in the assault on Ostend.
 Gaspard (1584–1646) comte then duc de Coligny, marshal of France (Maréchal de Chastillon)
 Charles seigneur de Beaupont
 Françoise (?–1637), in 1602 married René de Talensac seigneur de Londrières.

Family tree

References

French people of the French Wars of Religion
French generals
French nobility
1557 births
1591 deaths
Francois